Joinville is a commune in the Haute-Marne department in north-eastern France.

Originally spelled Jonivilla or Junivilla in Latin, in the Middle Ages it was the site of an important lordship in the county of Champagne. Its medieval château-fort, which gave to members of the House of Guise their title, Prince de Joinville, was demolished during the Revolution of 1789, but the 16th-century Château du Grand Jardin built by Claude de Lorraine, duc de Guise, has been restored.

Population

Transport
Joinville station is served by regional trains between Saint-Dizier and Chaumont. Joinville Mussey Airport (ICAO code LFFJ) is a small aifield, mainly used for gliding.

Twin towns – sister cities

Joinville is twinned with:
 Buckingham, United Kingdom

Personalities  

 Jean de Joinville
 Claude de Lorraine
 Louis de Guise, cardinal évêque de Metz
 François Lespingola
 Louis Yard
 Joseph Perrin des Almons (1717-1798)
 François Devienne
 Anne Joseph Arnoux Valdruche
 Christian Vander (musician) (1948 - )

See also
Communes of the Haute-Marne department

References

Communes of Haute-Marne
Champagne (province)